Nepenthes × cincta (from Latin cinctus "girdled") is a natural hybrid between N. albomarginata and N. northiana.

Nepenthes × cincta is a rare plant and, due to the localised distribution of N. northiana, only grows at a few sites in Bau, Sarawak, usually on a substrate of limestone. N. × cincta is one of only three known natural hybrids involving N. northiana, the others being N. × bauensis and a cross with N. mirabilis.

The traits of N. albomarginata are very dominant in this hybrid; the wide flared peristome of its larger parent species (N. northiana) is almost completely lost. Pitchers are narrowly infundibulate (funnel-shaped) throughout and range in colouration from cream to dusky purple with red or black spots.

References

 [Anonymous] 1890. Nepenthes cincta. The Gardeners' Chronicle, series 3, 8(185): 48.
 Clarke, C.M. & C.C. Lee 2004. Pitcher Plants of Sarawak.  Natural History Publications, Kota Kinabalu, p. 32.
 Lee, C.C. 2000. Recent Nepenthes Discoveries. [video] The 3rd Conference of the International Carnivorous Plant Society, San Francisco, USA.
 McPherson, S.R. & A. Robinson 2012. Field Guide to the Pitcher Plants of Borneo. Redfern Natural History Productions, Poole.

cincta
Carnivorous plants of Asia
Endemic flora of Borneo
Flora of Sarawak